Ferdinand Pfohl (12 October 1862, Elbogen, Bohemia, Austria-Hungary, now Loket n.O., Czech Republic – 16 December 1949, Hamburg-Bergedorf), was a German music critic, music writer and composer.

Pfohl studied law at Prague, then in Leipzig he studied music as private pupil of Oscar Paul and attended courses in philosophy at the university, worked as music critic at Leipziger Tageblatt and Königlich-Leipziger Zeitung; from November 1892 to 1931 he was music editor of Hamburger Nachrichten, since 1913 to 1934 teacher and co-director of Vogt Conservatory in Hamburg (Thompson - Slonimsky - Sabin). Prof. h.c., Dr. phil. h.c., author of many books on music, e.g. a biography on famous Hungarian conductor Arthur Nikisch and on Richard Wagner.

Pfohl was amongst the most highly regarded music critics in Germany; his opinions carried a great deal of weight. Amongst music circles he was particularly well known as a writer and composer (Willscher in Musik in Geschichte und Gegenwart, 2005).

His compositions include a lot of lieder, some piano pieces and works for orchestra.

The Pfohl-Woyrsch-Society, Pfohl-Woyrsch-Gesellschaft e.V. Hamburg is going to revive his music and to inform about his musical and literary works.

References 
Andreas Willscher, Ferdinand Pfohl—Ein Böhme in Hamburg, 2001. Publisher: Editio Baerenreiter Praha, 144 pages, 
Rudolf Hayo Pfohl, Ferdinand Pfohl—Ein "Leib- und Seeleneigener der Musik" in the Pfohl-Woyrsch-Society's 1999 Newsletter (“Mitteilungen”), pp. 6–36
Ferdinand Pfohl, Leben und Schaffen, Autobiographical sketches and memoirs, in Zeitschrift für Musik Bd. 109, 1942, 
Ferdinand Pfohl, Wie ich Musikkritiker wurde, Zeitschrift für Musik Bd. 99, 1932, 
Kurt Stephenson, F. Pfohl at his 75. birthday, four living pictures with a prologue and reflections, Zeitschrift für Musik 1937, pages 1103-1105
Thompson - Slonimsky - Sabin, The International Cyclopedia of Music and Musicians, 1964,  (English)
Andreas Willscher, Die Musik in Geschichte und Gegenwart (MGG), 2002, volume 13, 
Helmut Brenner/Reinhold Kubik: Mahlers Menschen. Freunde und Weggefährten. St. Pölten - Salzburg - Wien 2014, .
Articles in other encyclopedias, newspapers and magazines.

External links 
 Pfohl-Woyrsch-Society
 Biography

1862 births
1949 deaths
People from Loket
German Bohemian people
19th-century German people
20th-century German people
German Romantic composers
German music critics
German people of German Bohemian descent
German male non-fiction writers
German male classical composers
20th-century German male musicians
19th-century German male musicians
People from Bergedorf